The New Jersey Army National Guard consists of more than 6,000 Citizen-Soldiers. The New Jersey Army National Guard is currently engaged in multiple worldwide and homeland missions. Units have deployed to Iraq, Guantanamo Bay, Afghanistan, Germany, Kosovo, Kuwait, Qatar, Bahrain, and Egypt. The Guard has also deployed to help with the recovery from Hurricane Irma in Texas and the U.S. Virgin Islands, Hurricane Maria in Florida and Puerto Rico, and Hurricane Katrina in New Orleans.

The New Jersey Army National Guard is governed through the New Jersey Department of Military and Veterans Affairs.

On the home front, the Guard is responsible for homeland security tasks in the State of New Jersey.

The New Jersey National Guard contributed forces to the 44th Division when it was reformed on Oct. 19, 1920 as a result of the National Defense Act of 1920's major expansion of the National Guard. As originally conceived, the division was to consist of National Guard units from the States of Delaware, New Jersey and New York. The 57th Infantry Brigade was the New Jersey contribution. The brigade had the 113th and 114th Infantry Regiments.

The New Jersey Army National Guard maintained the 50th Armored Division in the force from 1946 to 1988, and afterwards contributed a New Jersey brigade to the 42nd Infantry Division.

Commander-in-Chief: Phil Murphy, Governor of New Jersey

The Adjutant General: Brig. Gen. Lisa J. Hou, D.O.

Deputy Adjutant General: Col. Yvonne L. Mays

Acting Deputy Commissioner for Veterans Affairs: Col. (Retired) Walter R. Nall

Structure
44th Infantry Brigade Combat Team

 104th Brigade Engineer Battalion at West Orange
 Company A (Engineer) at West Orange
 Company B (Military Intelligence) at West Orange
 Company C at Lawrenceville
1st Squadron, 102d Cavalry Regiment at Westfield
 Headquarters and Headquarters Troop at Westfield
 Troop A at Dover
 Troop B at West Orange
 Troop C at Hackettstown
2d Battalion, 113th Infantry Regiment at Riverdale
 Headquarters and Headquarters Company at Riverdale
 Company A at Newark
 Company B at Jersey City
 Company C at Woodbridge
 Company D at Jersey City
1st Battalion, 114th Infantry Regiment at Woodbury
 Headquarters and Headquarters Company at Woodbury
 Company A at Mount Holly
 Company B at Freehold
 Company C at Blackwood
 Company D at Woodstown
1st Battalion, 181st Infantry Regiment at Worcester, MA (Mass Guard)
 Headquarters and Headqarters Company at Worcester, MA 
 Company A at Agawam, MA
 Company B at Gardner and Greenfield, MA
 Company C at Cambridge, MA
 Company D at Whitinsville, MA
250th Brigade Support Battalion at Teaneck
 Headquarters and Headquarters Company at Teaneck
 Company A (Distribution) at Teaneck
 Company B at Manchester
 Company C at Jersey City
 Company D at Westfield (102nd Forward Support Company)
 Company F at Morristown (112th Forward Support Company)
 Company G at Vineland (114th Forward Support Company)
 Company H at Teaneck (113th Forward Support Company)
 Company I at Whitinsville, MA (181st Forward Support Company) (Mass Guard)
3d Battalion, 112th Field Artillery Regiment at Morristown
 Headquarters and Headquarters Battery at Morristown
 Detachment 1, Headquarters and Headquarters Battery at Freehold
 Battery A at Morristown
 Battery B at Flemington
 Battery C at Toms River

42nd Regional Support Group at Somerset
117th Combat Sustainment Support Battalion at Woodbridge
143rd Transportation Company
508th Military Police Company at Teaneck
50th Chemical Company at Somerset
119th Combat Sustainment Support Battalion at Vineland
253rd Transportation Company at Cape May
 Detachment 1 at Atlantic City
328th Military Police Company at Cherry Hill
154th Quartermaster Company (Water Purification) at Sea Girt
820th Quartermaster Detachment (Water Distribution) at New Egypt
50th Chemical at Somerset (New Brunswick)
250th Finance Detachment at Somerset (New Brunswick)
350th Finance Detachment at Somerset (New Brunswick)

57th Troop Command (HQ at Atlantic City)
 21st Civil Support Team at Fort Dix
1st Battalion (Assault Helicopter), 150th Aviation Regiment at Lakehurst
Company C, 1st Battalion (Security and Support), 224th Aviation Regiment at West Trenton Armory
 444th Public Affairs Detachment at Lawrenceville
1948th Contingency Contracting Team at JB-McGuire-Dix-Lakehurst-Fort Dix
 63rd Army Band at Sea Girt 

 254th Regiment (Combat Arms) at Sea Girt
 1st Battalion (Leadership)
 2nd Battalion (Modular Training Battalion)

 Observation Coach/Training (OC/T)

Recruiting and Retention Battalion at Sea Girt

Medical Command at Sea Girt

 Joint Force Headquarters at JB-McGuire-Dix-Lakehurst-Fort Dix 

 RTS-M (Regional Training Site - Maintenance) at JB-McGuire-Dix-Lakehurst-Fort Dix

Adjutants Generals of New Jersey
Colonel William Bott, 1776-1793
Brigadier General Anthony Walton White, 1793-1803
Mr. John Morgan, 1803-1804
Brigadier General Ebenezer Elmer, 1804
Brigadier General Peter Hunt, 1804-1810
Brigadier General James J. Wilson, 1810-1812, 1814
Brigadier General John Beatty, 1812-1814
Brigadier General Charles Gordon, 1814-1816
Brigadier General Zechariah Rossell, 1816-1842
Major General Thomas McCall Cadwalader, 1842-1858
Major General Robert Field Stockton, 1858-1867
Major General William Scudder Stryker, 1867-1900
Brigadier General Alexander Coulter Oliphant, 1900-1902
Brigadier General Reginald Heber Breintnall, 1902-1909
Brigadier General Wilbur Fisk Sadler Jr., 1909-1916
Brigadier General Charles V. Barber, 1916-1917
Brigadier General Frederick Gilkyson, 1917-1932
Brigadier General William A. Higgins, 1932-1941
Colonel Edgar N. Bloomer, 1941-1942
Brigadier General James Isaiah Bowers, 1942-1947
Major General Clifford Ross Powell, 1947-1948
Major General Edward C. Rose, 1948-1954
Major General James F. Cantwell, 1964-1970
Major General William R. Sharp, 1970-1974
Major General Wilfred C. Menard, Jr., 1974-1982
Major General Francis R. Gerard, 1982-1990
Major General Vito Morgano, 1990-1994
Major General Paul J. Glazar, 1994-2002
Major General Glenn K. Rieth, 2002-2011
Brigadier General Michael L. Cunniff, 2011-2018
Major General Jemal J. Beale, 2018-2020
Colonel Lisa J. Hou, 2020-2021 (Acting)
Brigadier General Lisa J. Hou, 2021-Present

Awards and Decorations in Order of Precedence
 New Jersey Distinguished Service Medal

 New Jersey Medal of Valor

 New Jersey Meritorious Service Medal

 New Jersey Commendation Medal

 New Jersey Ribbon of Honor

 New Jersey Good Conduct Ribbon

 New Jersey Merit Award

 New Jersey Desert Storm Service Medal

 New Jersey Desert Storm Ribbon

 New Jersey State Service Award

 New Jersey Recruiting Award

 New Jersey Governor's Unit Award

 New Jersey Unit Strength Award

Historic units
  102nd Cavalry Regiment
  112th Field Artillery Regiment
  113th Infantry Regiment, one of only nineteen Army National Guard units with campaign credit for the War of 1812
 157th Field Artillery Battalion
 157th Armored Field Artillery Battalion
 165th Armored Field Artillery Battalion
 199th Armored Field Artillery Battalion
 228th Armored Field Artillery Battalion
  254th Air Defense Artillery Regiment

See also

New Jersey Naval Militia
New Jersey State Guard

References

External links
New Jersey Army Guard (N.J. Dept. of Military & Veteran Affairs)
New Jersey Army National Guard at GlobalSecurity.org
  NJ Militia Museum

Military in New Jersey
New Jersey National Guard
Military units and formations established in 1945